The Player is a 1992 American satirical black comedy film directed by Robert Altman and written by Michael Tolkin, based on his own 1988 novel of the same name. The film stars Tim Robbins, Greta Scacchi, Fred Ward, Whoopi Goldberg, Peter Gallagher, Brion James and Cynthia Stevenson, and is the story of a Hollywood film studio executive who kills an aspiring screenwriter he believes is sending him death threats.

The Player has many film references and Hollywood in-jokes, with 65 celebrities making cameo appearances in the film. Altman once stated that the film "is a very mild satire," offending no one. The film received three nominations at the 65th Academy Awards: Best Director, Best Adapted Screenplay and Best Editing. The film also won two Golden Globes, Best Motion Picture – Comedy or Musical and Best Actor – Comedy or Musical for Robbins.

Plot
Griffin Mill is a Hollywood studio executive dating story editor Bonnie Sherow. He hears story pitches from screenwriters and decides which have the potential to be made into films, green-lighting only 12 out of 50,000 submissions every year. His job is threatened when up-and-coming story executive Larry Levy begins working at the studio. Mill has also been receiving death threat postcards, assumed to be from a screenwriter whose pitch he rejected.

Mill surmises that the disgruntled writer is David Kahane, and Kahane's girlfriend June Gudmundsdottir tells him that Kahane is at the Rialto Theater in Pasadena, at a screening of Bicycle Thieves. Mill pretends to recognize Kahane in the lobby, and offers him a scriptwriting deal, hoping this will stop the threats. The two go to a nearby bar where Kahane gets intoxicated and rebuffs Mill's offer, calling him a liar and continuing to goad him about his job security at the studio. In the bar's parking lot, the two men fight. Mill goes too far and drowns Kahane in a shallow pool of water while screaming, “Keep it to yourself!” Mill then stages the crime to make it look like a botched robbery.

The next day, after Mill is late for and distracted at a meeting, studio chief of security Walter Stuckel confronts him about the murder and says that the police know that he was the last one to see Kahane alive. At the end of their conversation Mill receives a fax from his stalker. Thus, Mill has killed the wrong man, and the stalker apparently knows this. Mill attends Kahane's funeral and gets into conversation with Gudmundsdottir. Detectives Avery and DeLongpre suspect Mill is guilty of murder.

Mill receives a postcard from the stalker suggesting that they meet at a hotel bar. While Mill is waiting, he is cornered by two screenwriters, Tom Oakley and Andy Sivella, who pitch Habeas Corpus, a legal drama featuring no major stars and with a depressing ending. Because Mill is not alone, his stalker does not appear. After leaving the bar, Mill receives a fax in his car, advising him to look under his raincoat. He discovers a live rattlesnake in a box and, terrified, bludgeons it with his umbrella.

Mill tells Gudmundsdottir that his near-death experience made him realize he has feelings for her. Apprehensive that Larry Levy continues encroaching on his job, Mill invites the two writers to pitch Habeas Corpus to him, convincing Levy that the movie will be an Oscar contender. Mill's plan is to let Levy shepherd the film through production and have it flop. Mill will step in at the last moment, suggesting some changes to salvage the film's box office, letting him reclaim his position at the studio. Having persuaded Sherow to leave for New York on studio business, Mill takes Gudmundsdottir to a Hollywood awards banquet and their relationship blossoms.

After Sherow confronts Mill about his relationship with Gudmundsdottir, Mill coldly severs their relationship in front of two writers. Mill takes Gudmundsdottir to an isolated Desert Hot Springs resort and spa. In the middle of Mill and Gudmundsdottir making love, Mill confesses his role in Kahane's murder, and Gudmundsdottir responds by saying she loves him. Mill's attorney informs him that studio head Joel Levison has been fired, and that the Pasadena police want Mill to participate in a lineup. An eyewitness has come forward, but she fails to identify Mill.

One year later, studio power players are watching the end of Habeas Corpus with a new, tacked-on, upbeat Hollywood ending and famous actors in the lead roles. Mill's plan to save the movie has worked and he is head of the studio. Gudmundsdottir is now Mill's wife and pregnant with his child. Sherow objects to the film's new ending and is fired by Levy. Mill rebuffs her when she appeals her termination to him. Mill receives a pitch over the phone from Levy and a man who reveals himself as the postcard writer. The man pitches an idea about a studio executive who kills a writer and gets away with murder. Impressed, Mill gives the writer a deal, if he can guarantee a happy ending in which the executive lives happily with the writer's widow. The writer's title for the film is The Player.

Cast

Production
Altman had troubles with the Hollywood studio system in the 1970s after a number of studio films (McCabe & Mrs. Miller, The Long Goodbye) lost money or had trouble finding audiences, despite the critical praise and cult adulation they received. Altman continued to work outside the studios in the late 1970s and throughout the 1980s, often doing small budget projects or filmed plays to keep his career alive. Chevy Chase was interested in playing the role of Griffin Mill, but Warner Bros. didn't want Chase to star in the film.

Although it was distributed by Fine Line Features rather than a major studio (FLF was a division of New Line Cinema), The Player was Altman's comeback to making films in Hollywood. It ushered in a new period of filmmaking for him, and he continued on to an adaptation of Raymond Carver's short stories, Short Cuts (1993).

Opening sequence shot
The opening sequence shot lasts 7 minutes and 47 seconds without an edit. Fifteen takes were required to shoot this scene, but, according to the slate at the beginning of the shot, the tenth take was used in the final edit.

Intimate scene
Altman was praised for the sex scene in which Robbins and Scacchi were filmed from the neck up. Scacchi later claimed that Altman had wanted a nude scene, but that it was her refusal which led to the final form.

Editing
The editing of The Player by Geraldine Peroni was honored by a nomination for the Academy Award for Best Film Editing. In 2004, Tony Sloman wrote an appreciation of the film's editing:

Reception
On Rotten Tomatoes, the film has an approval rating of 97% based on 65 reviews, with an average rating of 8.70/10. The site's critical consensus reads: "Bitingly cynical without succumbing to bitterness, The Player is one of the all-time great Hollywood satires — and an ensemble-driven highlight of the Altman oeuvre." On Metacritic, the film has a score of 86 out of 100, based on 20 critics, indicating "universal acclaim."

Roger Ebert gave the film a full four stars out of four and called it "a smart movie, and a funny one. It is also absolutely of its time. After the savings and loan scandals, after Michael Milken, after junk bonds and stolen pension funds, here is a movie that uses Hollywood as a metaphor for the avarice of the 1980s. It is the movie The Bonfire of the Vanities wanted to be." Gene Siskel also gave the film a perfect four-star grade and wrote, "If you knew nothing and cared nothing about the movie business, you can still appreciate The Player as a ripping good thriller, too." Vincent Canby of The New York Times wrote, "Robert Altman has not really been away. Yet his new Hollywood satire titled The Player is so entertaining, so flip and so genially irreverent that it seems to announce the return of the great gregarious film maker whose Nashville remains one of the classics of the 1970's".

Todd McCarthy of Variety wrote: "Mercilessly satiric yet good-natured, this enormously entertaining slam dunk represents a remarkable American come-back for eternal maverick Robert Altman." Terrence Rafferty of The New Yorker called it "a brilliant dark comedy about the death of American filmmaking," adding: "In this picture Altman is doing one of his specialties: exploring an odd American subculture—revealing its distinctive textures and explicating the peculiar principles of social intercourse which keep it functioning. But when his idiosyncratic style of anthropological realism is applied to the tight community of Hollywood 'players' it has an almost hallucinatory effect." Peter Rainer of the Los Angeles Times wrote that "Altman has made a movie that's supremely deft and pleasurable. As if to taunt his detractors, he even 'tells a story' this time, and he does a better job of it than the hacks who have been getting work when he couldn't."

The Player was placed on 80 critics' year-end best lists, second only to Howards End in 1992.

Awards and nominations

Legacy
In 2015, Entertainment Weeklys 25th anniversary year, it named The Player in its list of the 25 best movies since the magazine's beginnings. Rolling Stone listed The Player as one of the best movies of the 90's.

See also
List of films featuring fictional films

Notes

References

External links

 
 
 
 
 
 
 
The Screenplayer an essay by Sam Wasson at the Criterion Collection

1992 films
1990s black comedy films
American black comedy films
American satirical films
BAFTA winners (films)
Best Musical or Comedy Picture Golden Globe winners
Edgar Award-winning works
1990s English-language films
Films based on American novels
Films directed by Robert Altman
Films featuring a Best Musical or Comedy Actor Golden Globe winning performance
Films set in Los Angeles
Films shot in California
Films shot in Los Angeles
Self-reflexive films
Independent Spirit Award for Best Film winners
Films about Hollywood, Los Angeles
Films scored by Thomas Newman
Films whose director won the Best Direction BAFTA Award
Films whose writer won the Best Adapted Screenplay BAFTA Award
Films produced by David Brown
Films with screenplays by Michael Tolkin
Spelling Films films
1992 comedy films
Films about filmmaking
Films about film directors and producers
Films about screenwriters
1990s American films
1992 independent films
American independent films